is a Japanese professional footballer who currently plays as a centre-back or right-back for Singapore Premier League Club Geylang International.

Career statistics

Club

Notes

References

1997 births
Living people
Ryutsu Keizai University alumni
Japanese footballers
Japanese expatriate footballers
Association football defenders
Japan Football League players
Singapore Premier League players
Albirex Niigata players
Albirex Niigata Singapore FC players
Japanese expatriate sportspeople in Singapore
Expatriate footballers in Singapore
Japanese expatriate sportspeople in Cambodia
Expatriate footballers in Cambodia